The Wellington Dukes were a minor league baseball team based in Wellington, Kansas. From 1909 to 1911, the Dukes played exclusively as members of the Kansas State League, having been preceded in league play by the 1887 Wellington Browns, who won the Kansas State League championship. Wellington hosted minor league home games at Woods Park.

History
Minor league baseball in Newton, Kansas began with the 1887 Wellington Browns. The Browns won the league championship as charter members of the six–team Independent level Kansas State League, which reduced to four teams during the season. After beginning league play on May 17, 1887, the Kansas State League folded on August 8, 1887, with Wellington in first place on that date. Wellington compiled a 20–15 record playing under manager Jack Pettiford to finish 3.0 games ahead of the second place Arkansas City team in the final standings.

In 1909, the Wellington "Dukes" resumed minor league play in a new league. Wellington became members of the reformed eight–team Class D level Kansas State League. Newton joined the Arkansas City-Winfield Twins, Great Bend Millers, Hutchinson Salt Packers, Larned Cowboys, Lyons Lions, McPherson Merry Macks and Newton Railroaders as 1909 league members.

In their first season of Kansas State League play, the Wellington Dukes placed sixth in the 1909 Kansas State League. Wellington finished with a 44–54 overall record to end the season to place sixth in the eight–team league. Playing under managers Cy Mason and John Meade, the Dukes finished 17.0 games behind the first place Lyons Lions in the final Kansas State League standings.

Continuing play as members of the 1910 Kansas State League, the Wellington Dukes finished the season with a record of 48–56 to place sixth under managers C. Pinkerton, Spencer Abbott, Harry Vitter and Lewis Armstrong. The Dukes finished 19.5 games behind the first place Hutchinson Salt Packers in the final 1910 standings of the eight–team league.

On August 12, 1910, Wellington pitcher Henry Grohs threw a no-hitter in a 1–0 Dukes victory over the Larned Wheat Kings.

The 1911 Wellington Dukes played their final season and finished last in the standings as the Kansas State League folded during the season. The Kansas State League folded on July 11, 1911. The Dukes ended the 1911 season with a record of 15–38 record, after the league disbanded on July 11, 1911, due to crop failures and drought. When the league ceased play, Wellington was in 8th place in the standings, as the Duked ended their final season finished 21.0 games behind the 1st place Great Bend Millers (39–20) in the shortened season.

The Kansas State League resumed play in 1914, without a Wellington franchise. Wellington, Kansas has not hosted another minor league team.

The ballpark
The Wellington minor league teams played home games at Woods Park. Woods Park is still in use today as a public park. It is located at 1110 West 4th Street, Wellington, Kansas.

Timeline

Year–by–year records

Notable alumni
Spencer Abbott (1910, MGR)

References

External links
Wellington - Baseball Reference

Defunct minor league baseball teams
Defunct baseball teams in Kansas
Baseball teams established in 1909
Baseball teams disestablished in 1911
Kansas State League teams
Sumner County, Kansas